Canada has been a member of the North Atlantic Treaty Organization (NATO) since its inception in 1949. Data for engagements can be found in the Department of National Defence webpage entitled "Past operations".

Past NATO Ambassadors

History
Canada is not only a member but one of the principal initiators (founding countries) of the alliance. This Atlanticist outlook was a marked break with Canada's pre-war isolationism, and was the first peacetime alliance Canada had ever joined.

Canadian officials such as Hume Wrong and Lester B. Pearson and including Prime Minister Louis St. Laurent worked in favour of the alliance not only because they sought to contain the Soviet Union, as did other members, but because they hoped the treaty would help to eliminate any potential rivalries between the United States, the United Kingdom, and other European great powers (principally at the time France, but later including West Germany), where Canada would be forced to choose sides. This had long been the overriding goal of Canadian foreign policy. The main Canadian contribution to the North Atlantic Treaty was Article 2 which committed members to maintain a "free" political system and to promote economic cooperation, in addition to the more usual diplomatic and military matters. Trans-Atlantic unity in political and economic matters has not come to fruition, as European states have looked toward the European Union and its antecedents while North America has the North American Free Trade Agreement.

Canada has stationed troops in Germany (at Kaiserslautern) since 1951. During the 1950s Canada was one of the largest military spenders in the alliance and one of the few not receiving direct aid from the United States. 

The costs of maintaining forces in Europe combined with those defending its own vast territory and participation in the Korean War caused strain on the Canadian budget during the 1950s.

In 1969 then Prime Minister Pierre Trudeau withdrew half of Canada's forces in Europe, even as many leftist intellectuals and peace activists called for a complete withdrawal from NATO.

With the success of the Canadian participation in the Suez Crisis, with the United Nations Peacekeeping Force in Cyprus  and on other UN peacekeeping missions like the United Nations Assistance Mission for Rwanda, United Nations Operation in Somalia I and Unified Task Force United Nations Operation in Somalia II or the four-year commitment to United Nations Angola Verification Mission II, perception in the 1990s evolved into the feeling that the forces had shifted from conventional warfighting to peacekeeping missions.  Nevertheless, the bulk of Canada's military was focussed on the less-glamorous NATO mission in Germany, where there remained a brigade group and the bulk of an air division. 

In all, there were over 5,000 soldiers at any given time deployed in Germany until 1993, when the remaining Canadian troops were withdrawn from Europe by the government of Brian Mulroney following the end of the Cold War. The peace dividend was spent elsewhere than on the military.

Given the small size of Canada's military, the importance of Canada's contribution to NATO has primarily been political rather than military.  However during NATO's 1999 Kosovo War, Canadian CF-18 jets were actively involved in bombing what remained of Yugoslavia.

Since it began in 2001 Canadian troops were part of the NATO-led mission in Afghanistan, ISAF.

In March 2011, the Canadian Forces  participated in NATO-led UN missions in Libya.

In 2019 it came to light that Canadian governments of the 21st century have been relative lightweights in the Alliance.

References

Further reading
  Bercuson, David J. "Canada, NATO, and Rearmament, 1950-1954: Why Canada Made a Difference (but not for very long)," in John English and Norman Hillmer, eds., Making a Difference: Canada's Foreign Policy in a Changing World Order (Toronto: Lester Publishing, 1992) pp 103–24
  Bercuson, David J. and J.L. Granatstein. Lessons Learned? What Canada Should Learn from Afghanistan (Calgary, 2011).
  online review
 
 Granatstein, J. L. "Is NATO Still Necessary for Canada?." CDFAI policy paper, March (2013). online
 Granatstein, J. L. Canada's Army: Waging War and Keeping the Peace (University of Toronto Press, 2002) 
 Kasurak, Peter C. A National Force: The Evolution of Canada's Army, 1950-2000 (University of British Columbia Press, 2013)
 Keating, Thomas F., and Larry Pratt. Canada, NATO, and the bomb: the Western Alliance in crisis (Hurtig Pub, 1988).
 
 Maloney, Sean M. War Without Battles: Canada's NATO Brigade in Germany, 1951-1993 (McGraw-Hill Ryerson, 1997).

External links

 NATO: When Canada Really Mattered by Norman Hillmer in The Canadian Encyclopedia
 Canada and NATO by Foreign Affairs Canada

Foreign relations of Canada
NATO relations